In mathematics, a measurable group is a special type of group in the intersection between group theory and measure theory. Measurable groups are used to study measures is an abstract setting and are often closely related to topological groups.

Definition 
Let  a group with group law 
.
Let further  be a σ-algebra of subsets of the set .

The group, or more formally the triple  is called a measurable group if

Topological groups as measurable groups 
Every second-countable topological group  can be taken as a measurable group. This is done by equipping the group with the Borel σ-algebra
,

which is the σ-algebra generated by the topology. Second countability ensures that , and therefore the group  is also a measurable group.

Related concepts 
Measurable groups can be seen as measurable acting groups that act on themselves.

References 

Measure theory
 Group theory